Wanchet River is a river of central Ethiopia, and a tributary of the Jamma River. Along with the Adabay River, it defined the border of the former district of Marra Biete. 

Its crossing "Aqui afagi" (Aheya Fajj, Amharic "destroyer of donkeys") is mentioned in the account of Francisco Álvares, who crossed it several times in the first quarter of the 16th century.

See also 
List of rivers of Ethiopia

References 

Rivers of Ethiopia
Nile basin